Houtdijken is a hamlet in the Dutch province of Utrecht. It is a part of the municipality of Woerden, and lies about 4 km northeast of Woerden.

Houtdijken is not a statistical entity, and the postal authorities have placed it under Kamerik. The hamlet was first mentioned in 1307 as In Hofdijc, and means "parcel of land on a dike". The name was later reinterpreted as hout (wood). Houtdijken has no place name signs. In 1840, it was home to 243 people. Nowadays it consists of about 20 houses including a retirement home with 12 apartments.

Gallery

References

Populated places in Utrecht (province)
Woerden